Álex Rodrigo da Rosa Comelles (born June 1, 1976 in Santiago, Brasil), best known as Álex da Rosa, is a naturalized Bolivian football midfielder, who plays for Bolivar in the Bolivian First Division.

Club career
Da Rosa began his career at the youth ranks of his hometown club Caxias. He continued playing in Brazil for other lower division clubs such as Esporte Clube São Bento, Uberlândia Esporte Clube and Esporte Clube São José. In 1999 Álex arrived in Bolivia for the first time and signed for big club Oriente Petrolero, however, he did not live up the expectations and left after a couple of months. His next team was Hungarian side MTK Budapest FC where he played through 2000. Back in Bolivia he joined Mariscal Braun where he had an outstanding season. His performance bought him a transfer to The Strongest in 2002. For the next three years, he maintained a good form and scored several goals for the club, helping The Strongest win two national titles in that period. In 2004, he naturalized Bolivian hoping to get a call and play for the national team.

In 2005, he relocated to Germany to join Bonner SC, before transferring to Colombian team Deportes Tolima the following year. Later, da Rosa moved back to Bolivia to play for Club Aurora. Subsequently, he signed for Blooming, but he was separated from the team shortly after because of indiscipline. Willing to clean his image, da Rosa joined Club San José in early 2007. At his arrival, he became a key player in helping San José obtain the Clausura title. Therefore, he was recognized as the most valuable player by the Bolivian sports media. Now he was the number 1 player in Club Bolívar.

International career
Since his naturalization, da Rosa has earned 5 caps for the Bolivia national team. He scored his first international goal for Bolivia on April 1, 2009, in that memorable victory over Argentina by 6-1 in La Paz.

International goals

Club titles

References

External links
 
 
 
 CBF 

1976 births
Living people
People from Rio Grande do Sul
Brazilian emigrants to Bolivia
Naturalized citizens of Bolivia
Bolivian footballers
Bolivia international footballers
Bolivian Primera División players
Categoría Primera A players
Oriente Petrolero players
Bolivian expatriate footballers
Expatriate footballers in Hungary
MTK Budapest FC players
The Strongest players
Nacional Potosí players
Expatriate footballers in Germany
Brazilian expatriate sportspeople in Colombia
Expatriate footballers in Colombia
Deportes Tolima footballers
Club Aurora players
Club Blooming players
Brazilian expatriate sportspeople in Germany
Club San José players
Association football midfielders